Adam Bedell (born December 1, 1991) is an American former professional soccer player who played as a forward.

Career

Early career
Born in Livonia, Michigan, Bedell played high school soccer at Winston Churchill High School and club soccer with the Michigan Crew Soccer Academy Wolves before attending the University of Detroit Mercy (UDM), where he played for the Detroit Titans. Bedell played in a purely defensive role at center back during his freshman and sophomore years at UDM before transitioning to a more attacking role at center midfield/forward for his junior and senior years. Despite spending only two years as a midfielder/forward, Bedell scored 23 goals and recorded 22 assists in his collegiate career as a Titan. In 2012, he was named the Horizon League Offensive Player of the Year and Horizon League Player of the Year in addition to an array of academic and athletic accolades. Bedell also played for Detroit City FC of the National Premier Soccer League in 2012 and 2013.

Columbus Crew
On January 21, 2014 it was announced that Bedell had been drafted in the 3rd round (45th overall) of the 2014 MLS SuperDraft by the Columbus Crew, and after playing for them in pre-season he was officially signed on March 7, 2014. Bedell scored his first professional goal at the 2014 Disney Pro Soccer Classic against Toronto FC and his first regular season goal on July 12, 2014 against the New York Red Bulls. On July 23, 2014, Bedell scored in an international friendly with Crystal Palace and again in the August 23, 2014 match with Houston Dynamo.

Orlando City
On August 6, 2015 Bedell was acquired by Orlando City SC from the Columbus Crew in exchange for a second-round pick in the 2016 MLS SuperDraft. He was released by Orlando at the end of the 2015 season.

HB Køge (loan)
On September 1, 2015 Bedell was loaned out to Danish side HB Køge until December 31, 2015. He scored a hat trick in his debut in a 2015–16 Danish Cup match.

Career statistics

References

External links
 

1991 births
Living people
American soccer players
Detroit City FC players
Columbus Crew players
Austin Aztex players
Richmond Kickers players
Orlando City SC players
Association football forwards
Sportspeople from Livonia, Michigan
Soccer players from Michigan
Columbus Crew draft picks
Major League Soccer players
USL Championship players
National Premier Soccer League players
HB Køge players
Detroit Mercy Titans men's soccer players
Danish 1st Division players